"Complicated" is a song by Belgian DJ and record producer duo Dimitri Vegas & Like Mike and French DJ and record producer David Guetta, featuring American singer-songwriter Kiiara. It was composed and produced by Angemi Antonino, David Guetta and Dimitri Vegas & Like Mike, with lyrics written by Hailey Collier, Peter Hanna, Kiiara and Ethan Roberts. The song was released on 28 July 2017 via Smash the House.

Background
On 14 July 2017, Dimitri Vegas posted a photo of himself and David Guetta, captioned "Big things coming". On 23 July 2017, Dimitri Vegas & Like Mike and David Guetta made their live performance debut of the song in Ibiza. On 25 July 2017, the duo shared a teaser via Epic Amsterdam, revealing the track's details and release date.

Critical reception
The song is described as an "irrefutably stylistic party anthem track that is sure to make a statement on the charts". Kat Bein of Billboard wrote that the song has "straightforward melodies, easy beats, and a good, clear vocal", and felt that there is "nothing flashy about this future bass drop". Jeffrey Yau of Your EDM thinks that the track "seemingly strikes the perfect balance between summer festival jam and infectious radio hit that'll easily stick in your head with its sugary-sweet lyrics and very simple chorus", "all three artists' sounds and styles" are well blended, and "the melodies in the track are memorable enough to keep the tune in your head for a full day or more". Erik of EDM Sauce wrote that the song "is not something groundbreaking" but "is honestly pretty good" and is "catchy and fun". He described the vocals as "electrifying" and the drop as "minimalist".

Music video
The music video was released on 21 August 2017. It was set in Ibiza and directed by Phillip R Lopez. The video depicts the Ibiza's landscapes with dancers. Kiiara can be seen wandering outdoors on cobble-stone city streets of Ibiza Town.

Track listing

Credits and personnel
Credits adapted from Tidal.
 Dimitri Vegas & Like Mike – composition, production
 David Guetta – composition, production
 Kiiara – lyrics
 Angemi Antonino – composition, engineering
 Hailey Collier – lyrics
 Peter Hanna – lyrics
 Ethan Roberts – lyrics
 Miles Walker – mix engineering
 Andrew Bolooki – vocal production

Charts

Weekly charts

Year-end charts

Certifications

References

2017 singles
2017 songs
David Guetta songs
Kiiara songs
Songs written by David Guetta
Dimitri Vegas & Like Mike songs
Song recordings produced by David Guetta
Songs written by Peter Hanna